Zubki is a rural locality (a village) in Zabolotskoye Rural Settlement, Permsky District, Perm Krai, Russia. The population was 18 as of 2010. There are 4 streets.

Geography 
Zubki is located 60 km southwest of Perm (the district's administrative centre) by road. Kommuna is the nearest rural locality.

References 

Rural localities in Permsky District